Pierre Cressé (1632 - 1714) was a 17th-century French physician during the reign of Louis XIV.

Biography
He was related to Molière's mother, Marie Cressé (1601-1632).

In 1657 he defended a thesis on the mineral waters of Passy and of Forges-les-Eaux and another thesis on the effect of tea on gout.

On 31 July 1671, the King Louis XIV appointed François Cureau de La Chambre as a demonstrator operator of the interior of plants of the Botanical Garden (Jardin des Plantes). Too busy with his duties, François Cureau de La Chambre appointed Pierre Cressé, to read the lectures, while the surgeon Pierre Dionis performed the actual dissections.

He engaged in a lively dispute with Guillaume Lamy over anatomical treatises, notably concerning the seat of the human soul.

Notes

References

17th-century French physicians
1632 births
1714 deaths